Chavargudd is a village in Dharwad district of Karnataka, India.

Demographics
As of the 2011 Census of India there were 231 households in Chavargudd and a total population of 1,204 consisting of 623 males and 581 females. There were 144 children ages 0-6.

References

Villages in Dharwad district